Horsfieldia is a genus of evergreen trees. The genus consists of about 100 species and is distributed across South Asia, from India to the Philippines and Papua New Guinea. Some species are used for timber. Species in the genus sometimes contain alkaloids, including horsfiline, which has analgesic effects.

Selected species

 List sources :

References

 
Myristicaceae genera